Hookerochloa is a genus of Australian plants in the grass family.

Species
 Hookerochloa eriopoda (Vickery) S.W.L.Jacobs - Queensland, New South Wales, Victoria
 Hookerochloa hookeriana (F.Muell. ex Hook.f.) E.B.Alexeev - New South Wales, Victoria, Tasmania

See also
List of Poaceae genera

References

Pooideae
Poaceae genera
Endemic flora of Australia
Grasses of Oceania